The Canal de jonction de Nancy (also: Embranchement de Nancy) is a canal in eastern France. It forms a connection between the Canal des Vosges at Richardménil and the Canal de la Marne au Rhin at Laneuveville-devant-Nancy. It was closed due to a collapsed embankment, but it was reopened in 2012. It is 10.2 km long with eighteen locks.

See also
List of canals in France

References

Nancy